Olearia stenophylla is a species of flowering plant in the family Asteraceae and is endemic to New South Wales. It is a shrub with oblong to linear leaves, and white and yellow, daisy-like inflorescences.

Description
Its young stems, the lower surface of the leaves and the peduncles are covered with loose, woolly, star-shaped hairs.

Taxonomy
Olearia stenophylla was first formally described in 2000 by Neville Grant Walsh in the journal Muelleria from specimens collected in Kosciuszko National Park in 1998. The specific epithet (stenophylla) means "narrow-leaved".

Distribution and habitat

References

stenophylla
Asterales of Australia
Flora of New South Wales
Plants described in 2000
Taxa named by Neville Grant Walsh